Bjerringbro is a railway town located at the railway line between Viborg and Randers and lying on both sides of the Gudenå (River Guden). Until 1 January 2007 it was the municipal seat of the former Bjerringbro Municipality and today, with a population of 7,437 (1 January 2022), it is the second largest town of Viborg Municipality, Central Denmark Region in Denmark.

The town is the site of the headquarters of Grundfos, the world's largest pump manufacturer.

Notable residents

 Marie Hjelmer (1869 Bjerring – 1937) a Danish women's rights activist and politician.
 Charles Buchwald (1880 in Bjerringbro – 1951) an amateur footballer who played seven games for Denmark and won two team silver medals, at the 1908 and 1912 Summer Olympics
 Søren Pape Poulsen (born 1971 in Bjerringbro) politician, former Justice Minister and Mayor of Viborg Municipality 2010 – 2014
 Henrik Baltzersen (born 1984 in Bjerringbro) a Danish amateur BMX cyclist, competed at the 2008 Summer Olympics
 Nikolaj Øris Nielsen (born 1986 in Bjerringbro) a handballer for Bjerringbro-Silkeborg, with 34 caps with for Denmark
 Rasmus Lauge Schmidt (born 1991 in Bjerringbro) a handball player, 117 cap with Denmark

References 

Cities and towns in the Central Denmark Region
Company towns
Viborg Municipality